Finternagh is a townland in County Cavan, Ireland. 

Finternagh is one of a number townlands of the Irish civil parish of Killinkere in the barony of Castlerahan, County Cavan, Province of Ulster. 

In the 1911 census of Ireland, the townland had seventeen houses with 100 inhabitants (45 males and 55 females).

References

External links
The IreAtlas Townland Data Base

Townlands of County Cavan